Sofi Tukker (stylized in all caps) is a musical duo based in Florida consisting of Sophie Hawley-Weld and Tucker Halpern. They are best known for their songs "Drinkee", "Best Friend", and "Purple Hat". "Best Friend" was featured in a commercial during Apple's unveiling of the iPhone X, while "Drinkee" was nominated for a Grammy at the 2017 Grammy Awards.  In December 2018, their album Treehouse was nominated for a Grammy for Best Dance/Electronic Album.

History
Sofi Tukker is the duo of Sophie Hawley-Weld and Tucker Halpern.

Sophie Hawley-Weld was born in Frankfurt, Germany, but grew up in rural Canada and Atlanta. She then attended United World College of the Adriatic, a UWC in Duino, Italy.

Tucker Halpern was born in Brookline, Massachusetts. Growing up, he was a basketball player who was recruited by major Division I basketball schools, ending up at Brown University where he played three years and was the captain for a year. Due to an illness, he changed his career, started DJing and concentrated on making music.

Halpern and Hawley-Weld first met at Brown University in 2014 at an art gallery where Hawley-Weld was performing. Halpern approached her and they began writing and performing songs together.

Sofi Tukker released an EP, Soft Animals on July 8, 2016. The EP includes "Drinkee", "Matadora", "Awoo", "Déjà Vu Affair", "Moon Tattoo", and "Hey Lion". The title comes from a Mary Oliver poem ("You only have to let the soft animal of your body love what it loves").

Their song "Drinkee" from the Soft Animals EP was nominated for a 2017 Grammy for Best Dance Recording. "Drinkee" is adapted from a poem written by the Brazilian poet, Chacal, sung sensually amidst cowbells, bongos, electric guitars and deep driving bass. Their song "Drinkee" is featured in The Incredible Jessica James.

In June 2019, their most recognisable track “Feeling Good” played in the trailer for the television series Dead to Me. This track was also featured in the soundtrack of the 2020 feature film Birds of Prey.

On April 24, 2020, Australian radio station Triple J premiered a new song created by the duo titled "When the Rona's Over", as part of a COVID-19 self-isolation musical challenge nicknamed Quarantune.

Sofi Tukker began DJing while sheltering at home due to the COVID-19 outbreak, reaching already 400 performances on April 19, 2021. Along the way, the show was expanded to Twitch, Facebook, Discord, Instagram Live. A social media-connected community of fans, known as the "Freak Fam", have even formed their own channels and held Zoom dance parties during the livestream.

In February 2022, Sofi Tukker debuted "Original Sin", the first single from their upcoming second album Wet Tennis.

Sofi Tukker's second studio album Wet Tennis was released on April 29, 2022.

Features
Their song "Johny" is featured in EA Sports' FIFA 17, and was adapted from a poem by Brazilian poet Paulo Leminski.

Their 2017 song "Best Friend" was played during the iPhone X full commercial reveal at the Apple Event on September 12, 2017. It is also included in the football game FIFA 18, the second straight year that a song of theirs has been included on the soundtrack of FIFA. It is also playing in the club scene in the 2018 movie Ocean's Eight, as well as during The Block Season 17 Episode 32 'Living & Dinings Continue'.

The clean version of their song "Batshit", titled "That's It (I'm Crazy)", was featured in a TV commercial for Apple promoting their special edition iPhone 8 RED smartphone in 2018.

Both "Best Friend" and "Batshit" were featured the episode "Robert Diaz (No. 15)" (season 6, episode 22) of the TV series The Blacklist.

On June 28, 2018, they collaborated with Italian DJ Benny Benassi for the single "Everybody Needs a Kiss", and on September 14, 2018, they released a remix of "Energia" with Brazilian singer Pabllo Vittar.

"Baby I'm a Queen" is featured in Xbox Game Studios' Forza Horizon 4.

"Swing" is featured in EA Sports' FIFA 20 and Need for Speed Heat. which also features "Playa Grande" and "Mi Rumba".`

"Good Time Girl" is featured during the opening credits of HBO's series The New Pope.

Reception
Paste magazine described the band's release as "an insatiable dance collection of jungle-pop songs with many well-executed nods towards Brazilian instruments, poets and to the national language, Portuguese". The magazine's review referred to the "carefully conceptualized 'Matadora'" as "the album's show-stopper".

Slant Magazine said of their album Treehouse, "the songs on Sofi Tukker's Treehouse are alternately playful and sincere, intimate and global." "Though Sofi Tukker's mélange of disparate sounds and influences—bossa-nova rhythms, cowbells, castanets, and spaghetti-western guitars—lends Treehouse an air of worldly sophistication, Hawley-Weld and Halpern never take themselves or their music too seriously. But that doesn't mean we shouldn't."

Discography

Studio albums

Extended plays

Singles

As lead artist

As featured artist
 "Brazilian Soul" (2018) 
 "Everybody Needs a Kiss" (2018) 
 "Fashion Model Art" (2020)

Remixes
2019: Laurent Wolf featuring Eric Carter — "No Stress" (Sofi Tukker Remix)
2020: Vintage Culture and Adam K featuring Mkla — "Deep Inside Of Me" (Sofi Tukker Remix)
2020: Lady Gaga — "911" (Sofi Tukker Remix)
2021: Rodrigo y Gabriela and Pelé — "Acredita No Véio (Listen To The Old Man)" (Sofi Tukker Remix)
2021: Rema — "Woman" (Sofi Tukker Remix)
2021: Jan Blomqvist and Bloom Twins — "High On Beat" (Sofi Tukker Remix)

Other charted songs

Awards and nominations

Grammy Awards

|-
|2017
|"Drinkee"
|Best Dance Recording
|
|-
|2019
|Treehouse
|Best Dance/Electronic Album
|
|-
|}

See also
List of artists who reached number one on the U.S. dance airplay chart

References

External links

2014 establishments in New York City
American dance music groups
American electronic music groups
American house music groups
American musical duos
Musical groups established in 2014
Musical groups from New York City
Ultra Records artists
People educated at a United World College